Lignol  may refer to:
 Lignol, Morbihan, a commune in France
 Lignol-le-Château, a commune in the Aube department in north-central France
 lignols, or monolignols, a category of polyphenolic compounds, monomers incorporated in lignin
 Lignol Innovations, a company with a pilot plant for cellulosic ethanol commercialization, in Vancouver